Poudretteite is an extremely rare mineral and gemstone that was first discovered as minute crystals in Mont St. Hilaire, Quebec, Canada, during the 1960s. The mineral was named for the Poudrette family because they operated a quarry in the Mont St. Hilaire area where poudretteite was originally found, and the quarry is currently owned by the United Kingdom based Salmon Mining Industries Inc. Poudretteite has a barely detectable radioactivity.

References

Hexagonal minerals
Minerals in space group 192
Potassium minerals
Cyclosilicates
Gemstones